Sir Frederick Johnstone, 7th Baronet (1810–1841) was a Member of Parliament (MP) for Weymouth and Melcombe Regis from 1832 to 1835. He was part of the Johnstone baronets family.

Life
The only son of Sir John Johnstone, 6th Baronet, he married in 1840 Lady Louisa Elizabeth Frederica Craven, only daughter of William Craven, 1st Earl of Craven. He died, after a fall from his horse, on 7 May 1841.

Johnstone inherited from his father the Westerhall estate on Grenada, and was paid compensation for it under the Slave Compensation Act 1837.

References

1810 births
1841 deaths
Baronets in the Baronetage of Nova Scotia
Members of the Parliament of the United Kingdom for English constituencies
UK MPs 1832–1835